Bill Capizzi, also known as Bill Capezzoli, Bill Capeze, Bill Kapezi, and A. Gregory (March 21, 1937 – March 26, 2007), was an American voice actor. Born and raised in Somerville, Massachusetts, and also raised in North Hollywood, California. Capizzi appeared in mostly bit roles in his live-action film and TV show appearances. Also a gifted voice actor, he appeared in numerous animated projects, such as Digimon Adventure, Robotech, and G-Force.

Capizzi died on March 26, 2007, in Scottsdale, Arizona, at the age of 70.

Filmography

Anime
 American Hot Wax (1978) – Member of Singing Group in Front of Theater
 Ringing Bell (1978) – Wolf (uncredited)
 Bâsu (1984) – Raider (Streamline 1992) (as A. Gregory)
 Dôwa meita senshi Windaria (1986) – Caleb / Cord / Court / Tank / Walla (1987)
 Robotech (1985) – Robotech Masters / Konda / Colonel Maistroff / General Reinhardt
 Robotech: The Movie (1986) –
 Twilight of the Cockroaches (1987) – Takashi (1992)
 G-Force: Guardians of Space (1987, TV Series)  – Galactor
 The Cockpit (1993)
 Teknoman (1995, TV Series)
 Digimon Adventure (1999-2000, TV Series) – Frigimon
 Mon Colle Knights (2000) – King Pezno the Penguin
 Shinzo (2000)
 Grimm’s Fairy Tale Classics (1987-1988 TV Series) - Rumpelstiltskin

Films
 Gone to Earth (1950) – Extra (uncredited)
 They Call Me Bruce? (1982) – Lil Pete
 What's Up, Hideous Sun Demon (1983) – George (voice)
 Katy La Oruga (1984) – Lenny (English version, voice)
 Peter-No-Tail in Americat (1985) - Max, Bull (English version, voice)
 The Intruder (1986) – Charlie (English version, voice, uncredited)
 The Stabilizer (1986) – Thug (English version, voice, uncredited)
 Dutch Treat (1987) – Franco
 Summer School (1987) – Security Guard
 The Church (1989) – Hermann the Sacristan (English version, voice, uncredited)
 Nikita (1990) – Interrogator / Doorman (English version, voice, uncredited)
 Heart and Souls (1993) – Race Track Ticket Clerk
 We're Back! A Dinosaur's Story (1993) – (voice)
 Don Juan DeMarco (1994) – Sultan
 In the Kingdom of the Blind, the Man with One Eye Is King (1995) – Cappy / Card Player
 Ed (1996) – Farley
 Bulletproof (1996) – Tommy
 Little Cobras: Operation Dalmatian (1997)
 True Friends (1998) – Sal
 Babe: Pig in the City (1998) – Snoop / The Sniffer Dog
 Monkey Business (1998) – George
 Soccer Dog: The Movie (1999) – Vito
 Lansky (1999, TV Movie) – Joe Masseria
 Kiss Toledo Goodbye (1999) – Two-Ton Tony
 Mercy Streets (2000) – Hot Dog Vendor
 Made (2001) – Arthur
 Fish Don't Blink (2002) – Fat Louie (final film role)

Television
 The Incredible Hulk (1979) – Ben
 Tenspeed and Brown Shoe (1980)
 Knots Landing (1982) – Maitre D'
 T. J. Hooker (1983) – Armando
 Hunter (1984) – Georgie
 Street Hawk (1985) – Cabbie
 Murder, She Wrote (1987) – Doorman
 Bride of Boogedy (1987) – Pizza Man
 Major Dad (1989) – Ernie Buckholtz
 Night Court (1989-1992) – Dan Look-Alike / Mr. Poplinsky
 NYPD Blue (1995) – Fat Mike
 Tarzan: The Epic Adventures (1996) – Achmed

Video games
 Might and Magic: World of Xeen (1996)
 Grim Fandango (1998) – Maximino

References

External links
 
 
 

1937 births
2007 deaths
American male voice actors
Male actors from Massachusetts
Male actors from Los Angeles
Robotech cast and crew
People from North Hollywood, Los Angeles